John Pierson (born April 10, 1954) is an American independent filmmaker.  He is best known for helping to produce the first works by filmmakers Spike Lee, Richard Linklater, Michael Moore, and Kevin Smith, which he wrote about in his 1995 book Spike, Mike, Slackers, & Dykes (reissued in 2004 as Spike, Mike Reloaded).

Career
After the publication of Spike, Mike, Slackers, & Dykes, Pierson began producing and hosting the TV show Split Screen, which premiered on IFC in 1997 and had an initial run of 60 episodes containing interviews and video essays covering topics related to American indie film. Season 10 premiered on January 13, 2018, on the Criterion Channel on FilmStruck. Pierson is founder and president of Grainy Pictures, Inc., a film and television production company.

Personal life
Pierson lives in Austin, Texas, and teaches in the University of Texas Radio-Television-Film department. His wife, Janet Pierson, is the chief programmer of the film section of South by Southwest.

Books
 Spike, Mike, Slackers, & Dykes: A Guided Tour Across a Decade of American Independent Cinema. New York: Miramax Books/Hyperion, 1995. 
 Spike, Mike Reloaded: A Guided Tour Across a Decade of American Independent Cinema.  New York: Miramax Books/Hyperion, 2003.

References

External links
 
 John Pierson: Short Bio

1954 births
Living people
Film producers from Texas
Writers from Austin, Texas
University of Texas at Austin faculty